Bill Gulliver (born 28 December 1912) is a Zimbabwean former sports shooter. He competed for Rhodesia in the trap event at the 1960 Summer Olympics.

References

External links
 

1912 births
Year of death missing
British emigrants to Rhodesia
Zimbabwean male sport shooters
Olympic shooters of Rhodesia
Shooters at the 1960 Summer Olympics
Sportspeople from Sheffield
British emigrants to Southern Rhodesia